Thomas Golden may refer to:

 Thomas M. Golden (1947–2010), United States federal judge
 Thomas Golden Jr. (born 1971), American politician in the Massachusetts House of Representatives
 Thomas L. Golden, American miner and prospector